The Union of Right Forces (SPS; ; Soyuz pravykh sil, SPS), is a Russian liberal-conservative political public organization and former party, initially founded as an electoral bloc in 1999 and associated with free market reforms, privatization, and the legacy of the "young reformers" of the 1990s: Anatoly Chubais, Boris Nemtsov, Sergey Kiriyenko and Yegor Gaidar. The party officially self-dissolved in 2008. Nikita Belykh was the party's last leader from 2005 to 2008.

In 2011, the SPS was refounded by some of its former members as the Union of Right Forces Movement. In 2012, it was registered as a political public organization, a type of NGO. In Russia, participation in elections requires being accepted into the list of political parties controlled by the Ministry of Justice. The current leader of the SPS is Leonid Gozman.

Both the former SPS and the refounded SPS were accepted as an associate member of the International Democrat Union.

Political party (1999–2008)
The SPS was established in 1999, following a merger of several smaller liberal parties, including Democratic Choice of Russia and Democratic Russia. In the 1999 parliamentary elections the SPS won 8.6% of the vote and 32 seats in the Russian State Duma (lower house of the Federal Assembly of Russia).

In the 2000 presidential election, the SPS supported Vladimir Putin's candidacy, though many of the party leaders supported Grigory Yavlinsky. The SPS parliamentarians overwhelmingly voted against reintroducing the Soviet-era national anthem in 2000.

The SPS was led by former Deputy Prime Minister Boris Nemtsov from 2000 to 2003. During this time SPS strongly opposed what it saw to be the authoritarian policies of President Vladimir Putin, and argued that political and media freedoms in Russia had been curtailed.

In the 2003 parliamentary elections the SPS, according to official results, received 4% of the vote and failed to cross the 5% threshold necessary for parliamentary representation. A number of SPS candidates came second in single-mandate electoral districts the party had previously held, such as Irina Khakamada in St. Petersburg, Vladimir V. Kara-Murza in Moscow, or Boris Nadezhdin in the Moscow region. Despite allegations of fraud, Boris Nemtsov accepted responsibility for the election defeat and resigned as SPS leader in January 2004. On 28 May 2005 Nikita Belykh was elected as the new leader of the party.

Plans to merge with Yabloko were shelved in late 2006.

The party won 0.96% of votes in the 2007 elections, not breaking the 7% barrier, and thus received no seats in the Duma.

In 2008, Nikita Belyh left his chair to Leonid Gozman. On 1 October 2008, the federal political council of the party voted to dissolve the party and merge it with Civilian Power and Democratic Party of Russia, forming a new liberal-democratic party called Right Cause, which succeeded the SPS as a member of the International Democrat Union.

Political public organization (2011–present)
In 2011, a group of former members accused the Right Cause of being too close to the Russian government under Vladimir Putin and refounded the SPS, registering it as a political public organization. As a consequence, the International Democrat Union suspended the membership of the Right Cause and returned it to the new SPS.

On 27 February 2014, the SPS formally condemned the 2014 Russian invasion of Ukraine.

Electoral results

Presidential

State Duma

See also

Liberalism
Liberal parties by country
Liberal democracy
Liberalism in Russia

References

External links
Union of Right Forces official site

 
1999 establishments in Russia
2008 disestablishments in Russia
Political parties disestablished in 2008
Political parties established in 1999
Classical liberal parties
Neoliberal parties